The Castle Ball or Ball at the Castle (Italian: Ballo al castello) is a 1939 Italian "white-telephones" romantic comedy film directed by Max Neufeld and starring Alida Valli, Antonio Centa and Carlo Lombardi.

The film's sets were designed by the art director Ottavio Scotti.

Cast
 Alida Valli as Greta Larsen 
 Antonio Centa as Tenente Paolo Karinsky 
 Carlo Lombardi as Giorgio 
 Sandra Ravel as Rita Valenti 
 Giuseppe Pierozzi as Ballet Master Petrovich 
 Corrado De Cenzo as Nicola 
 Vasco Creti as Sebastiano Larsen 
 Guido Notari as Director of the Theatre

References

Bibliography
 Nowell-Smith, Geoffrey & Hay, James & Volpi, Gianni. The Companion to Italian Cinema. Cassell, 1996.

External links 

1939 films
Italian romantic comedy films
1939 romantic comedy films
1930s Italian-language films
Films directed by Max Neufeld
Italian black-and-white films
1930s Italian films